Saaz may refer to:

Saaz, the former German name of Žatec, a town in the Czech Republic
Saaz hops, a hop variety used in production of pilsener style beer
DSV Saaz, a former football club in Žatec
Saaz (film), a 1998 Indian film
Saaz Complect (for "Skopinskiy Avtoagregatniy Zavod"), an automotive component factory in Skopin, Russia

See also
 Saas (disambiguation)
 Saz (disambiguation)